Dirickson Creek is a  long 3rd order tributary to Little Assawoman Bay, in Sussex County, Delaware.

Variant names
According to the Geographic Names Information System, it has also been known historically as:  
Williams Creek

Course
Dirickson Creek is formed at the confluence of Batson Branch and Bearhole Ditch about 0.25 miles northwest of Fenwick West in Sussex County, Delaware.  Dirickson Creek then flows east to meet Little Assawoman Bay at Laws Point, Delaware.

Watershed
Dirickson Creek drains  of area, receives about 44.7 in/year of precipitation, has a topographic wetness index of 714.69 and is about 4.9% forested.

See also
List of rivers of Delaware

References 

Rivers of Delaware